Bridal Veil Creek may refer to:
Bridal Veil Creek (Telluride), of Bridal Veil Falls (Telluride), above Telluride, Colorado
Bridal Veil Creek (Oregon), of Bridal Veil Falls (Oregon)

See also
Bridal Veil Falls (disambiguation)